KHYS may refer to:

 Hays Airport, Kansas, USA (ICAO code KHYS)
 KHYS (FM), a radio station licensed to operate on FM frequency 89.7 in Hays, Kansas, United States
 KTJM, a radio station formerly licensed as KHYS, licensed to serve Port Arthur, Texas, United States